Solur Bazar (also Romanized as Solūr Bāzār; also known as Sowlūr Bāzār) is a village in Polan Rural District, Polan District, Chabahar County, Sistan and Baluchestan Province, Iran. At the 2006 census, its population was 244, in 51 families.

References 

Populated places in Chabahar County